Luv Shuv Tey Chicken Khurana is a 2012 Indian Hindi-language comedy film produced by Ronnie Screwvala, Siddharth Roy Kapur and Anurag Kashyap and directed by debutante Sameer Sharma.

Plot
Omi Khurana's London dream has just ended. On the run from a dangerous UK gangster to whom he owes money, Omi returns to his native Indian village in Punjab, pretending to be a well-heeled London lawyer. Much has changed since Omi ran away from home a decade back after stealing money from his doting grandfather, Daarji. The old man has since become senile and more importantly, forgotten the secret recipe of "Chicken Khurana," a dish that made the Khurana dhaba famous across Punjab.

Omi's childhood sweetheart Harman is soon to be married to his paternal cousin, Jeet, though neither seems too happy about it. Adding to the quirkiness of the Khurana family is a freeloader uncle, Titu, who once did a stint in a mental asylum. Omi's grandfather has a cousin who ran away from home at a young age and is now a saint. When his grandfather dies on his last visit to his restaurant, Omi tries to restore their family restaurant with Harman's help. While working in the restaurant, the two reconcile and rekindle their feelings for each other. Meanwhile, Omi discovers the secret ingredient from his grandfather's famous chicken recipe was marijuana but keeps it a secret. When the family comes together, Jeet surprises everybody by revealing his love for a Bengali war-widow, Shama, and his secret daughter with her. Omi and Harman decide to get married. In the end, the whole family seems happy and celebrating when the gangster from whom Omi is hiding comes looking for him and is revealed to be Titu's long-lost friend.

Cast
 Kunal Kapoor as Omi Khurana
 Vicky Kaushal as Young Omi
 Huma Qureshi as Harman
 Vinod Nagpal as Daarji
 Rajesh Sharma as Titu Mama
 Rahul Bagga as Jeet Khurana
 Dolly Ahluwalia as Bua Ji
 Rajendra Sethi as Chacha Ji
 Seema Kaushal as Chachi Ji
 Mukesh Chhabra as Lovely (Harman's brother)
 Anangsha Biswas as Shama Chatterjee
 Anjum Batra as Dalidri
 Vipin Sharma as Kehar Singh
 Manish Makhija as Shanty
 Herry Tangri as Manty
 Nimrat Kaur as Muskaan Khurana (Cameo)
 Amit Jalali as Amit
 Tima as Harvard lady
 Faisal Rashid as Deedar Khurana (young Daarji)
 Balwinder Singh as Harman's father
 Gurpreet Brar as Harman's mother

Soundtrack 

Musicperk.com rated the album 7/10 quoting "Amit Trivedi's experiments are back".

Critical reception
Luv Shuv Tey Chicken Khurana received positive reviews. Trisha Gupta on Firstpost.com called it joyfully irreverent without ever feeling flippant: " a version of rural Punjab that is somehow quieter, gentler, sadder and yet funnier than those that have gone before". Madhureeta Mukherjee of Times of India gave it 3.5 stars. "This isn't the perfect chicken recipe for your soul, but never mind, it's the simplicity of emotions that fill you up, leaving a good after-taste." said ToI. Rediff Movies said "Luv Shuv Tey Chicken Khurana is a lovely story, with plenty of Punjab ka tadka." and gave it 3.5 stars. Roshni Devi of Koimoi gave it 3 stars. "Watch Luv Shuv Tey Chicken Khurana for some real Punjabi fun, laughs and touching moments." wrote Roshni Devi. Social Movie Rating site MOZVO gave it a rating of 3.4 putting it in 'Average' category. Taran Adarsh of Bollywood Hungama gave it 3.5 stars. Aniruddha Guha of DNA gave it 3 stars. Anupama Chopra from the Hindustan Times gave it 3/5 stars, saying "There is fun to be had here-just have some patience. After all, where else will you see a family having an animated conversation about 'kacchas'".

Box office

India
Luv Shuv Tey Chicken Khurana nett grossed  on the first day in India.

Overseas
Luv Shuv Tey Chicken Khurana grossed around $226,000 overseas in 1st weekend.

See also
 Bollywood films of 2012

References

External links
 
 

2012 films
2010s Hindi-language films
2012 comedy films
Indian comedy films
Films set in Punjab, India
UTV Motion Pictures films
Films scored by Amit Trivedi
Hindi-language comedy films
Films about chickens